Jenna-Anne Buys (born 22 November 1985 in Johannesburg) is South African former competitive figure skater. She is a three-time South African national champion and qualified to the free skate at three Four Continents Championships.

Programs

Results

References

External links

1985 births
Living people
South African female single skaters
Sportspeople from Johannesburg